Debelets is a town in northern Bulgaria, part of Veliko Tarnovo Municipality, Veliko Tarnovo Province. It is situated in the bottom side of the Belichinata valley near to Belitsa river. North from the town is situated a high peak named "Selski bair".

References

Towns in Bulgaria
Populated places in Veliko Tarnovo Province